Brett Rowe (born May 6, 1967) is an American professional stock car racing driver. He last competed part-time in the NASCAR Nationwide Series, driving the No. 55 for Shepherd Racing Ventures.

Racing career

During the early 2000s, Rowe raced in the ARCA Lincoln Welders Truck Series for his Front Rowe Racing team. In 2005, he won the series championship.

Rowe began competing in the Busch Series, later renamed the Nationwide Series, in 2007. In 2009, Rowe joined Herd Racing, driving the No. 75 car; the team name and number were tributes to the victims of the 1970 Marshall University plane crash. Herd's sister team Faith Motorsports, owned by Morgan Shepherd, fielded a Nationwide ride for Rowe in 2011 as Herd owner Dana Tomes did not own a Nationwide Series Car of Tomorrow.

Personal life
Rowe's brother Brian has also raced in the ARCA Truck Series.

Motorsports career results

NASCAR
(key) (Bold – Pole position awarded by qualifying time. Italics – Pole position earned by points standings or practice time. * – Most laps led.)

Nationwide Series

ARCA Re/Max Series
(key) (Bold – Pole position awarded by qualifying time. Italics – Pole position earned by points standings or practice time. * – Most laps led.)

References

External links
 

NASCAR drivers
1967 births
Living people
People from Barboursville, West Virginia
Racing drivers from West Virginia
ARCA Menards Series drivers